Lieutenant-Colonel Harold Marcus Ervine-Andrews, VC (29 July 1911 – 30 March 1995) was a British Army officer and an Irish recipient of the Victoria Cross, the highest award for gallantry that can be awarded to British and the  Commonwealth forces, for his actions during the Second World War.

Early life
Marcus Ervine-Andrews was born in Keadue, County Cavan, Ireland, on 29 July 1911, the son of a bank manager. He was educated by the Jesuits at Stonyhurst College, Lancashire, one of seven recipients of the VC who were educated at Stonyhurst.

Ervine-Andrews was commissioned in the East Lancashire Regiment, British Army in January 1932. He was sent to the Indian North West Frontier in 1936–37, where he was Mentioned in Despatches.

Events at Dunkirk
Ervine-Andrews was 28 years old, and a captain in the 1st Battalion, East Lancashire Regiment (part of the 1st Infantry Division), in the latter stages of the Battle of Dunkirk, when the following deed took place for which he was awarded the VC. During the night of 31 May/1 June 1940, near Dunkirk, France, the company commanded by Captain Ervine-Andrews had been ordered to defend  of territory. Already heavily outnumbered and under intense German fire, when the enemy attacked at dawn and crossed the Canal de Bergues, Ervine-Andrews, with volunteers from his company, rushed to a barn and from the roof, shot 17 of the enemy with a rifle, and many more with a Bren gun. When the barn was shattered and alight, he sent the wounded to the rear and led the remaining eight men back.

Victoria Cross citation
The announcement and accompanying citation for the decoration were30, published in supplement to the London Gazette on July 30, 1940, reading:

Post-war
Ervine-Andrews attempted to return home to his native County Cavan after the war, but was driven out by local members of the IRA and later settled in Cornwall. He later achieved the rank of lieutenant-colonel.

From 1955 he was involved with the Leonard Cheshire Foundation, first as the Warden of Wardour Castle Cheshire Home. After the Home closed in early 1957, he continued to advise the foundation on the setting up of new Cheshire Homes.

Personal life
Ervine-Andrews married Emily Torrie in 1939, with whom he had two children: a girl born in 1941; and a boy in 1943. Their marriage was dissolved in 1952. She died in 1975, thus permitting him to remarry, in 1981, to Margaret Gregory. This union was childless.

Death
The last surviving Irishman to be awarded the VC for service during the Second World War, Ervine-Andrews died in his home at Gorran, Cornwall on 30 March 1995, at the age of 83. Cremated at the Glynn Valley Crematorium, Bodmin, his memorial is at Stonyhurst College. He bequeathed his VC medal to the Lancashire Infantry Museum, but at his request it is on display at Blackburn Museum and Art Gallery.

References

External links
Captain H.M. Ervine Andrews in The Art of War exhibition at the UK National Archives
Grave and V.C. medal locations
 Imperial War Museum Interview
 VC record

1911 births
1995 deaths
British Army personnel of World War II
Military personnel from County Cavan
Irish officers in the British Army
East Lancashire Regiment officers
Irish World War II recipients of the Victoria Cross
People educated at Stonyhurst College
People from County Cavan
Place of death missing
British Army recipients of the Victoria Cross